Billy Kincaid is a supervillain serial child murderer in Todd McFarlane's Spawn comic book series.

Publication history

Kiddie Killer
In Spawn #5, Kincaid is released from a mental institution, where he had been placed because he was suspected of murdering several children. The most notable of the cases, and the only one Kincaid was actually charged with, was the disappearance and murder of a senator's daughter. In his previous life as Al Simmons, Spawn had been hired to kill Kincaid, but had arrived just as Kincaid was apprehended by the police and so was unable to complete the mission.

Upon his release from the institution, Kincaid immediately goes back to kidnapping and murdering children by luring them into his ice cream truck. He kills a child before Spawn gives him a fitting, but gruesome death: stabbed with an ice cream scooper, and popsicle sticks, with a note pinned to his torso. Spawn hangs his bloody corpse in the precinct office of detectives Sam Burke and Twitch Williams, who had been investigating Kincaid, the note reading: "Boys screamed and girls screamed. So I made him scream, and scream, and scream..." Both Sam and Twitch are consequently blamed for the gruesome incident and put on probation, though this is eventually cleared.

In Hell
Kincaid wakes up in Hell, in a necro-tree pod. He meets a team of people and they travel together. As each are taken one by one by demons, until only Kincaid and a little girl is left. While trying to strangle the girl, she reveals herself to be The Vindicator, brother of The Violator. The Vindicator gives Kincaid a "tour" of Hell and the various spheres of Hell in a giant tower. He leads Kincaid to the Eighth Circle of Hell, the place where Al Simmons made a deal with Malebolgia to become a Hellspawn. Kincaid is fitted with K3-Myrlu, a necroplasm-based, female, symbiote suit, which The Vindicator says "likes" Kincaid. The suit sexually bonds herself to Kincaid. He is then informed that he is now an officer, in the service of Satan's Army.

In Spawn #53, Spawn returns to Hell, where he battles the newly empowered Kincaid. It is a quick battle, as Spawn easily defeats Kincaid and severs his head.

Kincaid's Return
After a series of seemingly senseless and brutal crimes, Spawn (with the aid of Sam, Twitch, and his mentor, Cogliostro) discovers that Kincaid's ghost is forcing people into acting out their most violent impulses. These senseless crimes hit close to home, as a number of homeless people are savagely murdered. Spawn and the detectives are helpless to stop Kincaid as he jumps from body to body and continues to indirectly cause these senseless crimes. With each murder, Kincaid not only damns the innocent souls coerced into committing the crimes, but grows stronger himself. Eventually, Spawn leads Kincaid, inhabiting a police officer, into the Dead Zone, an area of the bowery where Heaven reigns supreme and Hell has no power. Now depowered, both Spawn and Kincaid fight each other hand-to-hand. During the melee, Twitch fires a single shot into the cop's forehead, killing the cop and the depowered Kincaid simultaneously.

Kincaid makes another brief appearance as a denizen of Hell in Spawn #100, as Spawn passes him on the way to battle Malebolgia.

Issue #150
Kincaid reappeared in Spawn #150 to torment Christopher, the lost soul sealed within Spawn's heart. Christopher is given the form and powers of a Hellspawn by the mysterious Man of Miracles, and eventually runs afoul of Kincaid, who operates a toystore filled with Spawn action figures. In later issues, Christopher confronts Kincaid again at a diabolical carnival revealed to be a portal to Hell. Kincaid forces Christopher to watch every murder he commits. Christopher's eyes burn out of their sockets, and his female, necroplasmic uniform then tears Kincaid apart, protecting her beloved host.

Recent Activity
Kincaid returns in Issue 306 where he is plotting to kill Spawn and Raptore. In 307 it is revealed that Billy, now going by his surname, is reborn as a hellspawn.

Appearances in other media
 Billy Kincaid was featured heavily in the first season of the HBO animated series Todd McFarlane's Spawn. In the series (voiced by Ronnie Cox), he was a senator's son and was protected by his father and Jason Wynn. Clown gave Kincaid Cyan's address to test Spawn, and he kidnapped her, planning to torture the child. However, he instead was later beaten by Spawn, who then takes Cyan home safely. At the end, Clown angrily shoots down the mortally wounded Billy after seeing Spawn leaving him for dead rather than outright kill him.
 Kincaid is the subject of American metal band Iced Earth's song "Vengeance Is Mine". He is also featured in the song "Living in the End" off of the album All Sides by the jamband O.A.R.

See also
 Spawn villains

References

External links
 Billy Kincaid toy, recreating the infamous death of Kincaid

Spawn characters
Fictional serial killers
Fictional murderers of children
Fictional ghosts
Fictional murdered people
Fictional pedophiles
Fictional rapists
Fictional undead
Comics characters introduced in 1992
Characters created by Todd McFarlane
Image Comics male supervillains